Lepista pulverulenta is a moth of the subfamily Arctiinae. It was described by Thomas Pennington Lucas in 1890. It is found in Australia, where it has been recorded from Queensland.

References

Lithosiina
Moths described in 1890